Events in 1978 in Japanese television.

Debuts

Ongoing shows
Music Fair, music (1964–present)
Mito Kōmon, jidaigeki (1969–2011)
Sazae-san, anime (1969–present)
Ōedo Sōsamō, anime (1970–1984)
Ōoka Echizen, jidaigeki (1970–1999)
Star Tanjō!, talent (1971–1983)
FNS Music Festival, music (1974–present)
Ikkyū-san, anime (1975–1982)
Panel Quiz Attack 25, game show (1975–present)
Candy Candy, anime (1976–1979)
Yatterman, anime (1977–1979)

Endings

See also
1978 in anime
1978 in Japan
List of Japanese films of 1978

References